Squeah is a locality in the lower Fraser Canyon of British Columbia, Canada, located between the unincorporated town of Yale (N) and the district municipality of Hope on the Fraser River. Squeah Indian Reserve No. 6 of the Yale First Nation, is located here, at the mouth of Suka Creek.

See also
List of communities in British Columbia

References

Unincorporated settlements in British Columbia
Fraser Canyon